1-deoxypentalenic acid 11beta-hydroxylase (PTLH (gene), SAV2991 (gene), PNTH (gene)) is an enzyme with systematic name 1-deoxypentalenic acid,2-oxoglutarate:oxygen oxidoreductase. This enzyme catalyses the following chemical reaction

 1-deoxypentalenate + 2-oxoglutarate + O2  1-deoxy-11beta-hydroxypentalenate + succinate + CO2

1-Deoxypentalenic acid 11beta-hydroxylase contains Fe(II) and ascorbate.

References

External links 
 

EC 1.14.11